LÉ Ciara (P42) was a  in the Irish Naval Service. Like the rest of her class, she was originally designed for use by the British Royal Navy in Hong Kong waters, and was delivered in 1984 by Hall, Russell & Company as HMS Swallow (P242). The ship was passed to the Irish Naval Service in 1988 and was commissioned under her current name by the then Taoiseach Charles Haughey on 16 January 1989.

Royal Navy service
The ship was built as HMS Swallow with the yard number of 991 at the Aberdeen yard of Hall Russell. She was launched on 30 March 1984 and completed on 17 October 1984. In 1988 she was sold to the Republic of Ireland and renamed LÉ Ciara.

Etymology
In Irish service, the ship took her name from Saint Ciara, born in Tipperary in the 7th century who, after taking religious vows in her teens, founded a convent in Kilkeary, near Nenagh. The ship's coat-of-arms depict three golden chalices which represent the three ancient dioceses among which Tipperary was divided. Also featured is a Celtic cross as a representation of the North Cross at Ahenny, County Tipperary. The coat of arms incorporates the Tipperary colours of Blue and Yellow as well as the background or field colours of the Tipperary Arms which is Ermine - white with a pattern of black arrowhead shaped points.

Weapons and equipment

The ship's principal armament is an OTO Melara 76 mm Compact gun. This has a  range and can fire 85 rounds per minute. It can be used in both anti-aircraft and anti-ship roles. It holds an 80-round magazine that can easily be reloaded by a two-man team. There are also two single 20 mm Rh202 Rheinmetall cannons and two 12.7 mm machine guns.

She is equipped with surveillance equipment and a fishery protection information system which is regularly updated via a satellite link to the Irish Naval Service base at Haulbowline Island near Cobh.

History
Throughout her career, LÉ Ciara has been involved in fisheries protection patrols as well as search and rescue missions.

In 2011, the vessel was temporarily taken out of service to address an issue with the hull, and was again kept out of commission for several months in mid-2014 for removal of asbestos.

References

External links

IDF LÉ Ciara webpage

1984 ships
Naval ships of the Republic of Ireland
Peacock-class corvettes of the Irish Naval Service
Peacock-class corvettes
Ships built by Hall, Russell & Company